The Utrecht Network is a network of European universities. Founded in 1987, the network promotes the internationalisation of tertiary education through summer schools, student and staff exchanges and joint degrees.

Utrecht Network member universities

Former members

See also 

 National Institutes of Technology – 31 leading public engineering universities in India

External links 
Official website

College and university associations and consortia in Europe